Santiagorothia is an extinct genus of interatheriid notoungulate. It lived during the Early Oligocene, and its fossils were discovered in Argentina and Chile.

Description

This animal was about the size of a large paca. It could reach 65 centimeters in length including its tail, with a skull approximately 10–11 centimeters ; it weighed between 5 and 7 kilograms. The molars of Santiagorothia were similarly sized to those of Eocene Archaeohyracidae, such as Pseudhyrax. The first incisors of Santiagorothia were enlarged and positioned straight in the alveoli, somewhat similar to human dentition. The upper premolars had two vertical ridges (ectoloph) and deep grooves on both sides of the lower premolars and molars, separating the anterior (trigonid), from the posterior (talonid).

Classification

Santiagorothia was first described in 2000, based on fossils found in Chile, near the Tinguiririca River, and in Argentina in deposits of the Sarmiento Formation, dating to the Early Oligocene. Santiagorothia is an interatheriid, a family of small to medium-sized notoungulates, with similarities to rodents. Santiagorothia was an archaic interatheriid, less specialized than the later Cochilius, Miocochilius, Protypotherium and Interatherium.

Palebioology

Santiagorothia was a terrestrial herbivore, which fed on low vegetation in open areas, and was probably quite fast and agile.

Etymology
The genus is named for Santiago Roth, "in honor of his contributions to South American paleontology".

References

R. Hitz, M. Reguero, A. R. Wyss and J. J. Flynn. 2000. New interatheriines (Interatheriidae, Notoungulata) from the Paleogene of Central Chile and Southern Argentina. Fieldiana: Geology (New Series) 42:1-26
M. A. Reguero and F. J. Prevosti. 2010. Rodent-like notoungulates (Typotheria) from Gran Barranca, Chubut Province, Argentina: phylogeny and systematics. In R. H. Madden, A. A. Carlini, M. G. Vucetich, R. F. Kay (eds.), The Paleontology of Gran Barranca: Evolution and Environmental Change through the Middle Cenozoic of Patagonia 148–165

Typotheres
Oligocene mammals of South America
Paleogene Argentina
Fossils of Argentina
Paleogene Chile
Fossils of Chile
Tinguirirican
Fossil taxa described in 2000
Prehistoric placental genera
Golfo San Jorge Basin